Arthur Crooks (1838–1888) was an English-American architect who practiced from offices located in New York City. He was highly regarded for his design of ecclesiastical buildings in New York and Connecticut for Roman Catholic clients.

Early life and career
Crooks was born in 1838 in England and immigrated to America prior to the Civil War. He was employed by architect and fellow Englishman Richard Upjohn before starting his own firm in the 1860s.
Crooks died unexpectedly in December 1888.

Works Include

Connecticut
 St. Patrick Church, Waterbury, Connecticut

New York
 Theiss Music Hall, New York City
 Kingston City Hall, Kingston, New York
 St. Peter's Church, Rosendale, New York
 St. Joseph Church, Middletown, New York
 St. Anthony of Padua Church, New York City
 St. John the Evangelist Church, New York City
 St. Joseph Church, alteration, New York City
 Sacred Heart Rectory, New York City

References

1838 births
1888 deaths
British emigrants to the United States
American ecclesiastical architects
Architects of Roman Catholic churches
19th-century American architects